William Brunton (1 February 1867 – 13 April 1938) was a businessman and Mayor of Melbourne, Australia.

History
Brunton was born in Carlton, Victoria, the son of David Brunton (c. 1826 – 27 January 1879)  and his wife Margaret Brunton, née Lonie.
He was educated at Princes Hill State School, and left school at an early to take an apprenticeship as carpenter and joiner.
Around 1887 he joined Currie & Richards, sheet metal fabricators, of which his uncle was a partner. Brunton became a partner and the company prospered. In 1918 it became a proprietary company, with Brunton as a director.

He was elected to the Melbourne City Council in 1913 and became mayor in 1923, resigning in 1926, in which year he was knighted in recognition of his charity work while in office.

Recognition
Brunton Avenue, Melbourne, was named for him.

Personal 
Brunton married Jessie Wray of Carlton on 14 February 1894; she died in 1927, deeply mourned as a humanitarian and philanthropist.
On 16 November 1932 he married Christine Martha McFadden. He had no children by either marriage.

References 

1867 births
1938 deaths
Mayors and Lord Mayors of Melbourne
People from Carlton, Victoria